Boogeyman Pop is a 2018 American independent anthology horror film written, edited and directed by Brad Michael Elmore. It stars James Paxton, M. C. Gainey, Dominique Booth, Greg Hill, Dillon Lane, Kyle Cameron, and Alixandra von Renner. The film was executive produced by Chris Weitz and Blumhouse Productions.

The film premiered at the Cinepocalypse Film Festival on June 23, 2018.

Premise 
A bat-wielding, masked killer in a rusted-out black Cadillac weaves in and out of three interlocking stories awash in sex, drugs, punk rock, black magic, and broken homes.

Cast 
 James Paxton as Tony
 M. C. Gainey as Ed
 Dominique Booth as Danielle
 Greg Hill as Matt
 Dillon Lane as Forrest
 Kyle Cameron as Slugger
 Alixandra von Renner as Nicole
 José Julián as Joe
 King Obra as Detective Tabor
 Dayton Sinkia as Steve
 Andrew Scheafer as Tyler
 Caleb Campbell as Adam
 Sam Jadzak as Blake

Production
Principal photography on the film began in May 2015.

Release
Boogeyman Pop premiered at the Cinepocalypse Film Festival on June 23, 2018.

References

External links 
 

2018 horror films
2018 horror thriller films
2010s horror drama films
American horror thriller films
American supernatural horror films
American slasher films
American horror anthology films
American horror drama films
American vampire films
American werewolf films
Blumhouse Productions films
2018 drama films
2010s English-language films
2010s American films